Latisternum is a genus of longhorn beetles of the subfamily Lamiinae.

 Latisternum burgeoni Breuning, 1935
 Latisternum macropus Jordan, 1903
 Latisternum marshalli Breuning, 1935
 Latisternum pulchrum Jordan, 1894
 Latisternum romani Breuning, 1935
 Latisternum simile Báguena & Breuning, 1958
 Latisternum strandi Breuning, 1935

References

Ancylonotini